Dactylopisthes is a genus of  dwarf spiders that was first described by Eugène Louis Simon in 1884.

Species
 it contains ten species:
Dactylopisthes digiticeps (Simon, 1881) (type) – France, Austria, south-eastern Europe, Turkey, Ukraine, Russia (Europe), Israel, Iran, Afghanistan
Dactylopisthes diphyus (Heimer, 1987) – Russia (South Siberia), Mongolia, China
Dactylopisthes dongnai Tanasevitch, 2018 – Vietnam
Dactylopisthes khatipara Tanasevitch, 2017 – Russia (Caucasus)
Dactylopisthes locketi (Tanasevitch, 1983) – Central Asia
Dactylopisthes marginalis Tanasevitch, 2018 – Thailand
Dactylopisthes mirabilis (Tanasevitch, 1985) – Kyrgyzstan
Dactylopisthes mirificus (Georgescu, 1976) – Romania, Ukraine, Russia (Europe, Urals), Kazakhstan
Dactylopisthes separatus Zhao & Li, 2014 – China
Dactylopisthes video (Chamberlin & Ivie, 1947) – Russia (Europe to Far East), Mongolia, USA (Alaska), Canada

See also
 List of Linyphiidae species

References

Araneomorphae genera
Linyphiidae
Spiders of Asia
Spiders of North America